Herbiphantes is a genus of Asian dwarf spiders that was first described by A. V. Tanasevitch in 1992.  it contains four species, found in China, Japan, Korea and Russia: H. acutalis, H. cericeus, H. longiventris and H. pratensis.

See also
 List of Linyphiidae species (A–H)

References

Araneomorphae genera
Linyphiidae
Spiders of Asia
Spiders of Russia